Leyla Alev Kelter (born March 21, 1991) is an American rugby sevens and rugby union player.

Rugby career
She won a silver medal at the 2015 Pan American Games as a member of the United States women's national rugby sevens team. She also made the squad to the 2016 Summer Olympics in Brazil.

Kelter was named in the Eagles squad to the 2017 Women's Rugby World Cup in Ireland.

In January 2022 the English rugby side Saracens Women announced that she had signed for the rest of the 2021–22 Premier15s season.  She was named in the Eagles squad for the 2022 Pacific Four Series in New Zealand. She was selected in the Eagles squad for the 2021 Rugby World Cup in New Zealand.

Soccer and Ice hockey
Kelter played for the United States women's national under-20 soccer team and the United States women's national under-18 ice hockey team and later played both sports at the University of Wisconsin from 2009–2013.

Personal life 
Born to Mark Perusse and Leyla Kelter, she has two brothers and a twin sister, Derya Kelter, who also played soccer and ice hockey. Before she was nine, her family had moved four times because her father was a fighter pilot in the U.S. Air Force. Kelter attended Chugiak High School in Chugiak, Alaska. She graduated with a degree in Fine Arts from University of Wisconsin in 2015. Kelter is a part of the LGBTQ community and has spoken out against banning transgender women from playing women's rugby.

References

External links 
 Alev Kelter at USA Rugby
 
 
 
 
 
 

1991 births
Living people
United States international rugby sevens players
Female rugby sevens players
Rugby sevens players at the 2015 Pan American Games
Pan American Games silver medalists for the United States
Rugby sevens players at the 2016 Summer Olympics
Olympic rugby sevens players of the United States
Wisconsin Badgers women's ice hockey players
Wisconsin Badgers women's soccer players
American women's ice hockey defensemen
American women's soccer players
Soccer players from Alaska
Ice hockey people from Anchorage, Alaska
Sportspeople from Anchorage, Alaska
Pan American Games medalists in rugby sevens
United States women's international rugby union players
American female rugby union players
American female rugby sevens players
Women's association football midfielders
Twin sportspeople
American twins
Medalists at the 2015 Pan American Games
Rugby sevens players at the 2020 Summer Olympics
21st-century American women